Mark Brooks may refer to:

 Mark Brooks (golfer) (born 1961), American professional golfer
 Mark Brooks (comics) (born 1973), American comic book artist
 Mark Brooks (director), American producer, director, and musician
 Mark Brooks, chairman of domestic violence charity the ManKind Initiative